Mexican Spaghetti Western is a studio album by Robert Rodriguez's band, Chingon. Originally released in 2004 exclusively on the band's website, it became available in stores on April 10, 2007. The original non-digi-pak release of the album did not include the song "Cielito Lindo".

Track listing
 "Se Me Paro" – 3:27
 "Malagueña Salerosa" (La Malaguena) – 4:07
 "Fideo Del Oeste" – 5:33
 "Severina" (co-written and sung by Patricia Vonne) – 3:01
 "Alacran y Pistolero" (written and performed by Tito Larriva) – 3:36
 "El Rey De Los Chingones" – 4:49
 "Bajo Sexto" – 3:29
 "Cielito Lindo" – 3:27
 "Mexican Sausage Link" – 3:06
 "Siente Mi Amor" – 4:26 (performed by Salma Hayek)
 "Cuka Rocka" [extended] – 6:08

Appearances in Rodriguez' films
"Malagueña Salerosa" is a re-arrangement of the classic mariachi standard, which Robert Rodriguez originally arranged for Desperado. It made its first appearance on this album, and also featured in Kill Bill: Volume 2. Rodriguez was credited in Kill Bill for his original guitar pieces in the film as well as part of Chingon.

"Siente Mi Amor" was featured on the soundtrack Once Upon a Time in Mexico, a film "shot, chopped and scored" by Robert Rodriguez, a follow-up to Desperado.

A shortened version of "Cuka Rocka" was also featured on the Once Upon a Time in Mexico soundtrack.

Bonus tracks
Some versions of the album feature, as a bonus track, "Sin City Theme (Chingonized)", another Rodriguez piece from a film he also directed.

The bonus edition additionally includes four tracks from the Machete soundtrack and the chingonized "Grindhouse Theme".

Musicians
 Robert Rodríguez – guitar and vocals
 Carl Thiel
 Rafael Gayol
 Cecilio Ruiz III from DaHeBeGeBees
 Various members from Del Castillo
 Tito Larriva on "Alacran y Pistolero"
 Salma Hayek – vocals on "Siente Mi Amor"
 Patricia Vonne – vocals on "Severina"

Other credits
 Album art by: George Yepes

References

Chingon (band) albums
2004 albums